Meghasandesam is a 1982 Telugu-language drama film, produced and directed by Dasari Narayana Rao under his Taraka Prabhu Films banner. It stars Akkineni Nageswara Rao, Jaya Prada, Jayasudha  and music composed by Ramesh Naidu. This film is the 200th movie of Akkineni Nageswara Rao. The film was featured in the Indian Panorama section at the 9th International Film Festival of India, and the Moscow film festival. It won four Awards including Best Feature Film in Telugu at the 30th National Film Awards "For its lyrical and aesthetic qualities", the Filmfare award for Best Telugu Film and Nandi award for Best Feature Film. The film won nine Nandi Awards.

Plot 
Ravindrababu (ANR) is a great poet, lover of nature and arts, and has a peculiar poetic and sensitive mindset. He marries a rustic and a simple woman, Parvathi (Jayasudha). Her brother Jagannatham (Jaggaiah) is extremely fond of his sister. Though Ravindrababu loves Parvathi as a wife, he fails to get inspiration from her as a poet. The couple lacks a good wavelength match. This is when he meets an artist personified woman, Padma (Jaya Prada). Her dance skills, expressions, looks, and poetic touch makes Ravindrababu express himself as a poet. Right from then, he transforms into an admirer of Padma. Parvathi feels bad for this, thinking Padma- a woman belonging to a prostitute family has snatched her husband. Jagannatham enters the scene and warns Padma not to disturb Ravindrababu's family. As a result, Ravindrababu gets deeply hurt. He becomes isolated with the fond memories of Padma and explains his grief in a poetic way to nature and clouds (Hence the name Megha Sandesam). He finds Padma and starts living with her while his wife lets him go understanding that he found his soulmate and decides not to be an obstacle. The film ends with his demise after meeting his wife many years later and expressing his regret for hurting her.

Cast 
 Akkineni Nageswara Rao as Ravindra Babu
 Jayasudha as Parvati, Ravindra Babu's wife
 Jaya Prada as Padma
 Jaggayya as Ravindra Babu's brother-in-law Jagannatham
 Mangalampalli Balamuralikrishna as himself
 Subhashini
 Saleema as Ravindra Babu's grown-up daughter

Crew 
Art: Bhaskar Raju
Choreography: Pasumarthi
Stills: Mohanji-Jaganji
Lyrics: Jayadeva, Devulapalli Krishna Sastry, Veturi, Palagummi Padmaraju, CiNaRe
Playback: M. Balamuralikrishna, K. J. Yesudas, P. Susheela, S. P. Sailaja, Purnachandra
Music: Ramesh Naidu
Editing: B. Krishnam Raju
Cinematography: P. S. Selvaraj
Story – Screenplay – Dialogues – Producer – Director: Dasari Narayana Rao
Banner: Taraka Prabhu Films
Release Date: 24 September 1982

Soundtrack 

Music composed by Ramesh Naidu. Music released on SEA Records Audio Company.

Awards 
Meghasandesam won four honors at the 30th National Film Awards. The film also won nine state Nandi Awards.

National Film Awards - 1982
National Film Award for Best Feature Film in Telugu - Dasari Narayana Rao 
National Film Award for Best Music Direction -Ramesh Naidu
National Film Award for Best Female Playback Singer - P. Susheela
National Film Award for Best Male Playback Singer -K. J. Yesudas

Nandi Awards - 1982
Best Feature Film - Gold- Dasari Narayana Rao
Best Actor - Akkineni Nageswara Rao
Best Actress - Jayasudha
Best Music Director - Ramesh Naidu
Best Lyricist -Devulapalli Krishnasastri
Best Male Playback Singer - K. J. Yesudas
Best Female Playback Singer - P. Susheela
Best Audiographer - A . R. Swaminadhan
Best Cinematographer - P.S. Selvaraj

Filmfare Awards South
Filmfare Award for Best Film – Telugu - Dasari Narayana Rao (1982)

Others 
 VCDs and DVDs on – VOLGA Videos, Hyderabad

References

External links 
 

1980s Telugu-language films
1982 films
Films directed by Dasari Narayana Rao
Films scored by Ramesh Naidu
Best Telugu Feature Film National Film Award winners